Alan Shillito is a former professional rugby league footballer who played in the 1980s.

Playing career

County Cup Final appearances
Alan Shillito played as an interchange/substitute, i.e. number 15, (replacing  Brett Atkins) in Castleford's 18-22 defeat by Hull Kingston Rovers in the 1985 Yorkshire County Cup Final during the 1985–86 season at Headingley Rugby Stadium, Leeds, on Sunday 27 October 1985, played as an interchange/substitute, i.e. number 15, (replacing  Brett Atkins) in the 31-24 victory over Hull F.C. in the 1986 Yorkshire County Cup Final during the 1986–87 season at Headingley Rugby Stadium, Leeds, on Saturday 11 October 1986, and played left-, i.e. number 8, (replaced by interchange/substitute Bob Beardmore) in the 12-12 draw with Bradford Northern in the 1987 Yorkshire County Cup Final during the 1987–88 season at Headingley Rugby Stadium, Leeds on Saturday 17 October 1987, but he did not play in the 2-11 defeat by Bradford Northern in the 1987 Yorkshire County Cup Final replay during the 1987–88 season at Elland Road, Leeds on Saturday 31 October 1987.

Club career
Alan Shillito signed for Castleford from Halifax on Tuesday 1 October 1985.

References

External links
Alan Shillito Memory Box Search at archive.castigersheritage.com

Living people
Castleford Tigers players
English rugby league players
Halifax R.L.F.C. players
Place of birth missing (living people)
Rugby league props
Rugby league second-rows
Year of birth missing (living people)